6Gig is an American rock band from the Portland, Maine area. It is classified by reviewers as alternative rock and nu metal. They actively played at clubs and different locations throughout New England. They released two CDs and several singles, as well as a video for the song "Hit the Ground" that received airplay on MTV2. Before the release of "Mind Over Mind", the band parted ways with drummer Dave Rankin and was joined by drummer Jason Stewart. Shortly after this, Rankin was found dead from a mixture of prescription drugs and alcohol.

Due to financial troubles at Ultimatum Music, "Mind Over Mind" never received an official release, instead being sold only over the label's website. This decision led the band to put the entire "Mind Over Mind" album online for free download in the summer of 2004 for a short time. The band separated in 2005 and its members have since joined other bands, including singer Walter Craven in Lost on Liftoff and Jason Stewart in Sidecar Radio.

6Gig reunited for two shows at The Big Easy in Portland, Maine during May 2–3, 2008. They reunited again in Portland on July 1, 2011, for a show at The Asylum. Since then they have been playing shows regularly. The band released an EP called Dogs in 2013.

Members 
Walter Craven – vocals, guitar
Steve Marquis – guitar, vocals
Craig Weaver – bass
Jason Stewart – drums
Dave Rankin – drums

Discography

Hits

"Hit the Ground" 
"Hit the Ground" was 6Gig's biggest hit. It appeared on the National Lampoon's Van Wilder  soundtrack, Ozzfest 2001 Summer Sampler and various compilation albums.  On the 2005 album Beautiful Locals, released on Labor Day Records, a compilation album of cover songs from Maine bands and artists, Paranoid Social Club, another Maine rock band, covers "Hit The Ground". The original song was also featured as a clip of music in an episode of MTV's Pimp My Ride, and as a soundtrack tune on NHL Hitz 2002 for the Xbox.

External links 
 
 6Gig collection at the Internet Archive's live music archive

Musical groups from Portland, Maine
Heavy metal musical groups from Maine
Musical groups from Maine
Rock music groups from Maine